Buddha Mil Gaya is a 1971 Hindi-language comedy thriller film, produced by L. B. Lachman and directed by Hrishikesh Mukherjee.

The film stars Om Prakash, Navin Nischol, Deven Verma, Archana, Sonia Sahni, Aruna Irani, Asit Sen and Lalita Pawar. The music is by R.D. Burman and the lyrics are by Majrooh Sultanpuri.

Plot 
Unemployed slackers Bhola and Ajay come across a newspaper advertisement about a missing elderly gentleman, whose estate is worth millions. They find him in the Hanging Garden Park in Bombay and decide to make him their paternal uncle. They take him to live with them in a rented apartment, which they cannot afford. This elderly man, Girdharilal, takes an unusual interest in Ajay's girlfriend, Deepa. While Bhola and Ajay try to find ways and means of getting rich by turning Girdharilal in, a number of horrific homicides are committed, all against former business associates of Girdharilal, and the clues all point toward the hapless duo.

Cast 
Navin Nischol - Ajay
Deven Verma - Bhola
Archana - Deepa
Sonia Sahni - Mona
Om Prakash - Girdharilal Sharma
Aruna Irani - Parvati
Lalita Pawar - Deepa's paternal grandmother
Asit Sen - Jhunjhunwala
M. B. Shetty
Brahm Bhardwaj - Bhagat
Dulari - Nirmala Sharma

Music 

The lyrics were written by Majrooh Sultanpuri and the music was given by Rahul Dev Burman.

References

External links 
 

Films scored by R. D. Burman
1971 films
1970s Hindi-language films
Films directed by Hrishikesh Mukherjee
Indian comedy thriller films